The Displeasure is a Canadian animated short film, directed by Alisi Telengut and released in 2021. A fantastical fable, the film centres on a battle of wills between a young girl and the family dog for the attention of the girl's father.

The film premiered in October 2021 at the Festival du nouveau cinéma.

The film won the Prix Iris for Best Animated Short Film at the 24th Quebec Cinema Awards in 2022.

References

External links
 

2021 films
2021 animated films
Canadian animated short films
2021 short films
2020s animated short films
2020s Canadian films
Best Animated Short Film Jutra and Iris Award winners